The 1999 UC Davis football team represented the University of California, Davis as an independent during the 1999 NCAA Division II football season. Led by seventh-year head coach Bob Biggs, UC Davis compiled an overall record of 10–2. 1999 was the 30th consecutive winning season for the Aggies. UC Davis was ranked No. 5 in the NCAA Division II poll at the end of the regular season and advanced to the NCAA Division II Football Championship playoffs for the fourth straight year. The team outscored its opponents 393 to 233 for the season. The Aggies played home games at Toomey Field in Davis, California.

Schedule

References

UC Davis
UC Davis Aggies football seasons
UC Davis Aggies football